The Queensland State Recruiting Committee was established by the Australian Government in December 1916 to encourage Queensland men to enlist in the Australian Imperial Forces after the failure of the first conscription plebiscite in 1916. It replaced the volunteer Queensland Recruiting Committee which operated from May 1915 to December 1916.

Membership
The initial membership of the committee included:
  Thomas Givens, Australian senator for Queensland
Littleton Groom, Member of the House of Representatives for Darling Downs
 Jim Page, Member of the House of Representatives for Maranoa 
 John Adamson, Australian senator for Queensland
 Robert Christian Ramsay
 W. G. King
 Canon David John Garland
 Captain George Macdonald Dash (secretary)

References

External links 
  — full available online

Military recruitment in Queensland in World War I